John Hewitt may refer to:
 John Hewitt (priest) (died 1588), English Roman Catholic priest and Catholic martyr, beatified in 1929
 John Hewitt (antiquary) (1807–1878), English official
 John Hill Hewitt (1801–1890), newspaper editor
 John Napoleon Brinton Hewitt (1859–1937), linguist
 John Hewitt (herpetologist) (1880–1961), South African zoologist and archaeologist
 John Haskell Hewitt (1835–1920), American classical scholar and educator
 John Hewitt (poet) (1907–1987), poet from Northern Ireland
 John Hewitt (mayor) (1943–2011), New Zealand local-body politician
 John Hewitt (entrepreneur) (born 1949), U.S. entrepreneur
 John Hewitt (footballer) (born 1963), Scottish former footballer and manager
 John Hewitt (pentathlete) (born 1925), British Olympic pentathlete
 John Hewitt, author of the Ringworld role-playing game
 John K. Hewitt (born 1952), behavioral geneticist from Hampshire, England
 John Marshall Hewitt (1841–1888), member of the Arkansas House of Representatives

See also
 Jonathan Hewitt, EastEnders character
 Jack Hewitt (born 1951), former driver
 John Hewett (disambiguation)
 John Hewet (disambiguation)
The John and Vivian Hewitt Collection of African-American Art